A French postcard is a small, postcard-sized piece of cardstock featuring a photograph of a nude or semi-nude woman. Such erotic cards were produced in great volume, primarily in France, in the late 19th and early 20th century. The term was adopted in the United States, where such cards were not legally made. The cards were sold as postcards, but the primary purpose was not for sending by mail, as they would have been banned from delivery. The cards sometimes even depicted naked lesbians. French street vendors, tobacco shops and a variety of other vendors bought the photographs for resale to tourists.

French postcard images
A number of photographers and studios produced French postcards, with some of them featuring particularly popular models.

Orientalist images
Many photographers and studios specialized in images with an Orientalist theme.

References

Further reading
 French Postcards: An Album of Vintage Erotica, Martin Stevens. Universe Books/Rizzoli, 2007, 
 P. Hammond French undressing: naughty postcards from 1900 to 1920. London: Jupiter, 1976.
 W. Oulette, B. Jones Erotic postcards. New York: Excalibur, 1977.

Postcards
Pornography